Craigysgafn is a rocky ridge and a top of Moelwyn Mawr that leads south from Moelwyn Mawr to Moelwyn Bach in Snowdonia, North Wales. It has several gullies which lead directly down to the scree slopes above Llyn Stwlan. Some scrambling is needed in places.

References

External links 
www.geograph.co.uk : photos of Craigysgafn and surrounding area

Ffestiniog
Llanfrothen
Mountains and hills of Gwynedd
Mountains and hills of Snowdonia
Hewitts of Wales
Ridges of Wales
Nuttalls